Lynley Hamilton (born 12 May 1959) is an Australian former cricketer who played as a right-arm medium bowler and right-handed batter. She appeared in nine One Day Internationals for International XI at the 1982 World Cup. She played domestic cricket for South Australia.

References

External links
 
 

Living people
1959 births
Cricketers from Adelaide
Australian women cricketers
International XI women One Day International cricketers
South Australian Scorpions cricketers